is an autobahn in Rhineland-Palatinate, Germany. It runs from Bad Dürkheim-Bruch to Ludwigshafen.

Exit list 

Exits are numbered from west to east.

|colspan="2" style="text-align:center;"| || to Kaiserslautern

|-
|colspan="3"|

  

|-
|colspan="3"|

|-
|colspan="2" style="text-align:center;"| || to Mannheim
|}

External links 

650
A650
Anterior Palatinate